Ren Farong (June 1936 – 26 May 2021) was a Chinese Taoist priest, religious leader, calligrapher, philanthropist, and politician. He was Venerable Master of the Chinese Taoist Association between 2005 and 2015. He was a member of the 8th, 9th, 10th National Committee of the Chinese People's Political Consultative Conference. He was a member of the 11th and 12th Standing Committee of the Chinese People's Political Consultative Conference.

Biography
At age 19, he paid a religious homage to the Temple of King of Medicine, from then on, he yearned for Taoism. Soon, he received complete ordination under Taoist priest Wang Silin, a 28th generation disciple of Quanzhen School. In 1984, he was proposed as the new abbot of Louguantai, one of the 72 blessed places of Taoism. In 1986, he became president of Shaanxi Taoist Association. On June 24, 2005, he was elected Venerable Master of the Chinese Taoist Association. On 26 May 2021, he died of illness in Xi'an, Shaanxi, aged 84.

Works

References

1936 births
2021 deaths
People from Tianshui
People's Republic of China calligraphers
Chinese philanthropists
Members of the 8th Chinese People's Political Consultative Conference
Members of the 9th Chinese People's Political Consultative Conference
Members of the 10th Chinese People's Political Consultative Conference
Members of the Standing Committee of the 11th Chinese People's Political Consultative Conference
Members of the Standing Committee of the 12th Chinese People's Political Consultative Conference